The Gutian dialect (Eastern Min: 古田話) is a dialect of Eastern Min spoken in Gutian, Ningde in northeastern Fujian province, China.

Phonology
The Gutian dialect has 15 initials, 52 rimes and 7 tones.

Initials

Rimes

Tones

Initial assimilation
The two-syllable initial assimilation rules are shown in the table below:

Tone sandhi
The two-syllable tonal sandhi rules are shown in the table below (the rows give the first syllable's original citation tone, while the columns give the citation tone of the second syllable):

References

.

Eastern Min
Gutian County